Potebnia Institute of Linguistics is a research institute in Ukraine, which is part of the National Academy of Sciences of Ukraine department of literature, language, and art studies.  It is focused on linguistic research and studies of linguistic issues. The institute is located in Kyiv.

History
The institute was established in 1930 after merging several smaller separate linguistic research institutions that existed in the 1920s, particularly the Institute of Ukrainian Scientific Language. The institute is named after Ukrainianist Alexander Potebnja (properly Olexander Potebnia). Due to political persecutions in the Soviet Union in the 1930s, the real work of the new institute did not start until after World War II. In the 1930s many members of the institute were tried at staged trials of the Union for the Freedom of Ukraine.

In 1991 from the department of Ukrainian Studies, there was created separate Institute of Ukrainian Language.

Departments
 General linguistics
 General Slavic languages issues and East Slavic languages
 West and South Slavic languages
 Russian language
 Romance, Germanic, and Baltic languages
 Languages of Ukraine

Directors
 Mykhailo Kalynovych
 Leonid Bulakhovskyi
 Vitaliy Rusanivskyi
 Vitaliy Sklyarenko
 Bohdan Azhniuk

Publications
 "Movoznavstvo"

Building
Besides the Potebnya Institute of Linguistics, the building also houses two other research institutes of the National Academy of Sciences of Ukraine: the Shevchenko Institute of Literature and the Institute of History of Ukraine.

Employees 
At various times, the Institute has employed well-known linguists:

 А. Y. Krymsky
 E. K. Timchenko
 I. V. Sharovolsky
 О. N. Sinyavsky
 P. Y. Goretsky
 О. B. Kurylo
 M. Y. Kalynovych
 M. G. Grunsky
 L. A. Bulakhovsky
 I. M. Kirichenko
 А. O. Biletskyi
 M. A. Zhovtobryukh
 V. S. Ilyin
 I. A. Bagmut

Gallery

See also
 2014 Hrushevskoho Street riots

External links
 Official website

 
Institutes of the National Academy of Sciences of Ukraine
Educational institutions established in 1930
NASU department of literature, language and art studies
Research institutes in Kyiv
1930 establishments in the Soviet Union
Research institutes in the Soviet Union